Boyds (previously also known as Boyd) is an unincorporated community in Union Township, Fayette County, Ohio, United States.

References 

Unincorporated communities in Fayette County, Ohio